Robert Kanigel (born May 28, 1946) is an American biographer and science writer, known as the author of seven books and more than 400 articles, essays, and reviews.

Early life
Born in Brooklyn, Kanigel graduated from Stuyvesant High School in New York City, and received a B.S. in Mechanical Engineering from Rensselaer Polytechnic Institute.

Career
After college, he held three engineering jobs before becoming a freelance writer in 1970. Over the next 30 years, Kanigel lived and wrote in Baltimore, Maryland and San Francisco, California.  His articles appeared in magazines including the Johns Hopkins Magazine, Baltimore Sun, The New York Times Magazine, New York Times Book Review, Wilson Quarterly, Change, American Health, Psychology Today, Washington Post, Los Angeles Times, Science 85, The Sciences, Mosaic, Longevity, National Observer, and Human Behavior.

His first book, Apprentice to Genius: The Making of a Scientific Dynasty, was published in 1986. This was followed by The Man Who Knew Infinity: A Life of the Genius Ramanujan in 1991; The One Best Way: Frederick Winslow Taylor and the Enigma of Efficiency in 1999; High Season: How One French Riviera Town Has Seduced Travelers for Two Thousand Years in 2002; and Faux Real: Genuine Leather and 200 Years of Inspired Fakes in 2007.   Vintage Reading: From Plato to Bradbury, a Personal Tour of Some of the World's Best Books, published in 1998, is a compilation of 80 book reviews.

In 1999, Kanigel became professor of science writing at the Massachusetts Institute of Technology, where he helped start its Graduate Program in Science Writing, which he directed for seven years. In 2011, he returned to live and write in Baltimore.  He is currently working on a biography of Jane Jacobs.

On An Irish Island is an ensemble biography of the scholars, linguists, and writers who visited Ireland's Blasket Islands during the early twentieth century. While doing research on one of the subjects of the book, George Derwent Thomson, Kanigel came across the ideas of Milman Parry, the "Darwin of Homeric Studies". Kanigel followed his interest and wrote a biography released in 2021 as Hearing Homer's Song: The Brief Life and Big Idea of Milman Parry.

Awards and honors
 John Simon Guggenheim Memorial Foundation Fellowship, 2008 
 Alfred P. Sloan Foundation grant, 2005
 Jennie Mae and Ellis L. Krause Lecture, Marietta College, Ohio, 2001
 Class of 1960 Innovation in Education Award, MIT, 2003 
 Alfred and Julia Hill Lecture on Science, Society, and Mass Media, University of Tennessee, Knoxville, 1999
 Global Business Book Awards (Financial Times/Booz-Allen & Hamilton) finalist, biography, 1997
 American Society of Journalists and Authors Author of the Year, 1998
 Elizabeth Lewisohn Eisenstein Prize, National Coalition of Independent Scholars, 1994
 Alfred P. Sloan Foundation grant, technology book series, 1992 
 National Book Critics Circle Award finalist, biography, 1992 
 Los Angeles Times Book Prize finalist, science and technology, 1991 
 James T. Grady-James H. Stack Award for Interpreting Chemistry for the Public, American Chemical Society, 1989
 Marine Biological Laboratory Science Journalism Program, Woods Hole, Massachusetts, 1988
 Council for the Advancement and Support of Education, Best Articles of the Year, gold award, 1988
 Smolar Award for Excellence in American Jewish Journalism, Council of Jewish Federations, public affairs, 1980
 A.D. Emmart Award for Writing in the Humanities, Maryland, 1979

Works

Nonfiction 

Biographies
 Apprentice to Genius: The Making of a Scientific Dynasty. Macmillan hardcover, 1986. Johns Hopkins University Press paperback, 1993. Taiwanese edition, Commonwealth Publishing, 1998. Chinese edition, Shanghai Scientific, 2001. 
 The Man Who Knew Infinity: A Life of the Genius Ramanujan. Scribner's hardcover, 1991. U.K. hardcover, Scribner's, 1991. Washington Square Press paperback, 1992. U.K. paperback, Abacus, 1992. Indian edition, Rupa, 1992. German edition, Vieweg Verlag, 1993. Cassette book, National Library for the Blind, 1993. Japanese edition, Kousakusha, 1994. Korean edition, Science Books, 2000. Chinese editions, Shanghai Scientific, 2002, 2008. Italian edition, Rizzoli, 2003. Thai edition, Matichon, 2007. Audio edition, Blackstone Audio, 2007. Greek edition, Travlos, 2008. 
 The One Best Way: Frederick Winslow Taylor and the Enigma of Efficiency. Viking hardcover, 1997. U.K. hardcover, Little, Brown 1997. Penguin paperback, 1999. U.K. paperback, Abacus, 2000. MIT Press paperback, 2005. 
 Eyes on the Street: The Life of Jane Jacobs. Knopf, 2016. 
 

Guides
 Vintage Reading: From Plato to Bradbury, a Personal Tour of Some of the World's Best Books. Bancroft Press, 1998. E-book edition, 2010. 
 Ideas Into Words: Mastering the Craft of Science Writing. 2004. Co-author: Elise Hancock

History
 High Season: How One French Riviera Town Has Seduced Travelers for Two Thousand Years. Viking hardcover, 2002. UK hardcover [High Season in Nice] Little, Brown, 2002. UK paperback, Abacus, 2003. 
 Faux Real: Genuine Leather and 200 Years of Inspired Fakes. Joseph Henry Press hardback, 2007. University of Pennsylvania Press paperback, 2010. ZheJiang University Press Chinese edition, 2013. 
 On An Irish Island. Knopf. 2012.

References

External links 
 
 MIT Faculty Page
 Amazon author page for Robert Kanigel

1946 births
American biographers
American male biographers
American science writers
Living people
People from Brooklyn
Historians from New York (state)